Appavum Veenjum is a 2015 Indian Malayalam-language thriller drama film directed by Viswan and starring Sunny Wayne, Ramya Krishnan and Prathap Pothen.

Cast 
Sunny Wayne as Freddy Peter George (Jude)
Ramya Krishnan as Merlin Fernandez
Prathap Pothen as Fernandez
Reshma Rathore as Jela Fernandez
Devi Ajith
Sunil Sukhada as Doctor Naina
Arun
Balu Varghese as Jithu
Ouseppachan
Lishoy
Rajesh
Shwetha Menon as a doctor (cameo appearance)

Production
Ramya Krishnan returned to Malayalam cinema after a hiatus with this film. Reshma Rathore replaced Ragini Nandwani to play Sunny Wayne's love interest. This film marks her Malayalam debut and she plays a college student in the film. Prathap Pothen called his character crazy.

Soundtrack 
The music is composed by Ouseppachan. Prathap Pothen and his daughter Keya each sang a song in the film.
"Karineela Kannulla" - Veetraag

Recepetion
A critic from The Times of India opined that "The tale of love and revenge gives you a haunting feel. Most of the actor don't have much to do and seem wasted in blink-and-miss roles". Padmakumar K. of Manorama Online said that "the musical score, both background and the songs, by Ouseppachan is a pleasant surprise. The lush locales, perfect sound design and an off-beat treatment make Appavum Veenjum a blissful experience".

References

External links
Metromatinee review
Mollywood Times review
Nowrunning review

2015 thriller drama films
Indian thriller drama films
2010s Malayalam-language films